Alisma plantago-aquatica, also known as European water-plantain, common water-plantain or mad-dog weed, is a perennial flowering aquatic plant widespread across most of Europe and Asia, and apparently spread elsewhere in both the Old and New World.

Description

The flowers open in the afternoon. There are three blunt green sepals and 6 stamens per flower. The carpels often exist as a flat single whorl. It flowers from June until August. The fruits appear as a ring of seeds inside each flower.

Chemistry 
Chemical constituents of —rhizomes of Alisma orientale (syn. Alisma  var. orientale) as a traditional Chinese medicine—include alisol A 24-acetate and alisol B 23-acetate.

Similar species 
Narrow-leaved water plantain Alisma lanceolatum differs only in that the leaf tips are acuminate and shape is narrow lanceolate.

According to some sources, presumed specimens found in North America are actually the similar A. subcordatum and A. trivale.

Taxonomy
The word alisma is said to be a word of Celtic origin meaning "water", a reference to the habitat in which it grows.  Early botanists named it after the Plantago because of the similarity of their leaves.

Distribution and habitat
The species is widespread across most of Europe and Asia from Portugal and Morocco to Japan, Kamchatka and Vietnam. It is also regarded as native in northern and central Africa as far south as Tanzania, and in Australia. It is reportedly naturalized in southern Africa, New Zealand, Alaska, British Columbia, Washington state and Connecticut. Some sources maintain that the species is widespread across North America, but these reports appear to have been based on misidentified specimens. It is found on mud or in fresh waters.

Uses
The rootstocks contain starch and can be boiled or soaked to remove bitterness before eating. Aquatic plants in general should be cooked before consumption to kill parasites.

According to Flora of the U.S.S.R. (1934), "A powder prepared from dried roots is used in popular medicine as a cure for rabies and crushed leaves are used against mammary congestion; fresh leaves are employed in homeopathy. ... Since this species is often confounded or identified with others of the genus, the reported data may also refer to [A. orientale or A. lanceolatum]." A.  is also known as mad-dog weed, as if it could be used to cure rabies, but should not be confused with Scutellaria lateriflora (mad-dog skullcap), which is also sometimes called mad-dog weed.

Alisma orientale is sometimes treated as a variety of this species (A.  var. orientale).  The rhizomes of A. orientale have been used as a traditional Chinese medicine, ze xie.  However, it may have serious side effects or even toxic effects such as hepatotoxicity in patients with chronic hepatitis B.

References

External links

line drawing from Flora of Pakistan, Alisma plantago-aquatica
photo of herbarium specimen at Missouri Botanical Garden, collected in Ethiopia (Abyssinia) in 1898
Kew Royal Botanic Gardens, London, Alisma plantago-aquatica (common water-plantain)
Le Jardin du Pic Vert, Plantain d'eau, Alisma plantago-aquatica
Tela Botanica, Alisma plantain d'eau
NatureGate, Luontoportti, Helsinki, Water-plantain
Altervista Flora Italiana, Piantaggine acquatica
Royal Horticultural Society

plantago-aquatica
Flora of Africa
Flora of Asia
Flora of Australia
Flora of Central Asia
Flora of China
Flora of Europe
Flora of Gabon
Flora of Kosovo
Flora of New Zealand
Flora of Russia
Flora of Siberia
Freshwater plants
Medicinal plants of Europe
Medicinal plants of North America
Plants described in 1753
Plants used in traditional Chinese medicine
Taxa named by Carl Linnaeus